The World Mountain Running Association (WMRA) is the global governing body of mountain running.

For World Athletics purposes, mountain running takes place on terrain that is mainly off-road, but if there is significant elevation gain on the route, surfaced roads may be used. Courses involve considerable amounts of ascent (for mainly uphill races), or both ascent and descent (for up and down races with the start and finish at similar heights). The average incline is normally between five and twenty per cent. Courses are clearly marked and should avoid dangerous sections.

History
The WMRA was founded in 1984 as the International Committee for Mountain Running and the decision to change the name to the World Mountain Running Association was taken in 1998. In 1985, the organisation staged the first annual World Mountain Running Trophy. In 2002, World Athletics (then the IAAF) officially recognised the World Trophy as an international competition and in 2009 the name was changed to the World Mountain Running Championships.

The WMRA also stages the annual World Long Distance Mountain Running Challenge and a World Cup series of races. Competitions are also held for Masters (veteran) and under 18 year old runners.

Starting from 2021 (event postponed to 2022) a joint World Mountain and Trail Running Championships are held.

Competitions
 World Mountain Running Championships
 World Long Distance Mountain Running Championships
 European Mountain Running Championships
 WMRA World Cup

See also
 Fell running
 World Mountain Running Championships
 World Long Distance Mountain Running Championships

References

External links
 Official web site

Athletics organizations
Mountain running